In the Hooker reaction (1936) an alkyl chain in a certain naphthoquinone (phenomenon first observed in the compound lapachol) is reduced by one methylene unit as carbon dioxide in each potassium permanganate oxidation.

Mechanistically oxidation causes ring-cleavage at the alkene group, extrusion of carbon dioxide in decarboxylation with subsequent ring-closure.

References 

Organic reactions
Name reactions
Degradation reactions
Homologation reactions